El Salvador competed at the 2012 Summer Olympics in London, United Kingdom, from 27 July to 12 August 2012. This was the nation's tenth appearance at the Olympics.

Comité Olímpico de El Salvador sent a total of 10 athletes to the Games, 5 men and 5 women, to compete in 7 sports. Rifle shooter Melissa Mikec, wife of Serbian athlete Damir Mikec, was able to compete for her nation's team, despite having a dual citizenship with her husband's homeland. Road cyclist Evelyn García, who was at her third Olympic Games, reprised her role as El Salvador's flag bearer at the opening ceremony, the first being done in 2004. El Salvador, however, has yet to win its first Olympic medal.

Competitors
Comité Olímpico de El Salvador selected a team of 10 athletes, 5 men and 5 women, to compete in 7  sports. Road cyclist Evelyn García, at age 29, was the oldest athlete of the team, while rower Roberto López was the youngest at age 18.

| width=78% align=left valign=top |
The following is the list of number of competitors participating in the Games.

Athletics

Athletes from El Salvador achieved qualifying standards in the following athletics events (up to a maximum of 3 athletes in each event at the 'A' Standard, and 1 at the 'B' Standard):

Men

Women

Cycling

Road

Judo

Rowing

El Salvador qualified the following boats:

Men

Women

Qualification Legend: FA=Final A (medal); FB=Final B (non-medal); FC=Final C (non-medal); FD=Final D (non-medal); FE=Final E (non-medal); FF=Final F (non-medal); SA/B=Semifinals A/B; SC/D=Semifinals C/D; SE/F=Semifinals E/F; QF=Quarterfinals; R=Repechage

Shooting

Women

Swimming

Men

Women

Qualifiers for the latter rounds (Q) of all events were decided on a time only basis, therefore positions shown are overall results versus competitors in all heats.

Weightlifting

El Salvador qualified the following athletes:

See also
El Salvador at the 2011 Pan American Games

References

2012 in Salvadoran sport
Nations at the 2012 Summer Olympics
2012